São João do Polêsine is a municipality in the state of Rio Grande do Sul, Brazil.

Paleontology 

In this city there are outcrops with fossils.

See also
List of municipalities in Rio Grande do Sul

References

Municipalities in Rio Grande do Sul